Anthony Levala Shelton (born September 4, 1967) is a former American football defensive back who played two seasons with the San Diego Chargers of the National Football League (NFL). He was drafted by the San Francisco 49ers in the eleventh round of the 1990 NFL Draft. He played college football at Tennessee State University and attended Lincoln County High School in Fayetteville, Tennessee. Shelton was also a member of the Shreveport Pirates, and Winnipeg Blue Bombers of the Canadian Football League. He ended the 1991 season on injured reserve due to a sore shoulder.

References

External links
Just Sports Stats
Fanbase profile

Living people
1967 births
Players of American football from Tennessee
American football defensive backs
Canadian football defensive backs
African-American players of American football
African-American players of Canadian football
Tennessee State Tigers football players
San Diego Chargers players
Shreveport Pirates players
Winnipeg Blue Bombers players
People from Fayetteville, Tennessee
21st-century African-American people
20th-century African-American sportspeople